Simplexeburia divisa is a species of beetle in the family Cerambycidae, the only species in the genus Simplexeburia.

References

Eburiini